Mohammad Sadeghimehryar is a paralympic athlete from Iran competing mainly in category F556 discus and shot put events.

Mohammad has competed in five Paralympics.  His first was in 1988 where he competed in the class 4 pentathlon, in 1996 he competed in the PW 3-4 pentathlon and the THW6 shot put and discus.  His breakthrough came in 1996 Summer Paralympics where he won silver in both the F55 discus and shot put.  In 2000 he couldn't manage a medal in the shot put but improved to gold in the F56 discus which he successfully defended as his only event in 2004 Summer Paralympics.

References

External links
 

Year of birth missing (living people)
Living people
Paralympic athletes of Iran
Paralympic gold medalists for Iran
Paralympic silver medalists for Iran
Paralympic medalists in athletics (track and field)
Athletes (track and field) at the 1988 Summer Paralympics
Athletes (track and field) at the 1992 Summer Paralympics
Athletes (track and field) at the 1996 Summer Paralympics
Athletes (track and field) at the 2000 Summer Paralympics
Athletes (track and field) at the 2004 Summer Paralympics
Medalists at the 1996 Summer Paralympics
Medalists at the 2000 Summer Paralympics
Medalists at the 2004 Summer Paralympics
Iranian male discus throwers
Iranian male shot putters
Wheelchair discus throwers
Wheelchair shot putters
Paralympic discus throwers
Paralympic shot putters
21st-century Iranian people